The Loboc River (also called Loay River) is a river in the Bohol province of the Philippines. It is one of the major tourist destinations of Bohol.

The source of the Loboc River is located in the town of Carmen, almost in the center of Bohol. From Carmen, the river takes a westerly course for a distance of about  then flows due south into the Mindanao or Bohol Sea. Rainfall is distributed almost uniformly throughout the year, thus Loboc River has a steady and high base flow.

Attractions
The Loboc river passes through the town center of the Municipality of Loboc, offering a riverside view of the Loboc church across the highway.  Various activities on the river, including the river cruise and standup paddleboarding typically feature a scenic trip upriver to Busay falls, or to various points in the river where visitors can enjoy buffets, cultural presentations, firefly watching, birding, and even paddleboard yoga.

Prior to an earthquake that struck Bohol in 2013, night cruises on the Loboc river also featured lightshows through colored lights installed on the river banks. However, the lights were severely damaged due to the said earthquake.

Hydroelectricity

There is one hydroelectric plant on the Loboc River. Construction on the plant began in 1955, completed in 1957 and an expansion completed in 1968.

See also
Other significant rivers in Bohol:
Abatan River
Inabanga River

References

External links

 Loboc River, Bohol

Rivers of the Philippines
Landforms of Bohol
Tourist attractions in Bohol